The 1931–32 season was Mansfield Town's first season in the Football League where they competed in the Football League Third Division South. They finished their maiden season in 20th position with 32 points.

Final league table

Results

Football League Third Division South

FA Cup

Squad statistics

References
General
 Mansfield Town 1931–32 at soccerbase.com (use drop down list to select relevant season)
 Squad list sourced from 

Specific

Mansfield Town F.C. seasons
Mansfield Town